Westby James "Wes" Davoren (5 August 1928 – 21 September 2010) was an Australian politician. He was a Labor member for Lakemba in the New South Wales Legislative Assembly from 1984 to 1995.

Davoren was born in Campsie, New South Wales, and was educated at Sydney Technical High School. He was a senior production planner with the State Rail Authority and director of a co-operative building society and credit union before entering politics. He was president of the Punchbowl branch of the Labor Party 1970–84 and secretary of the Lakemba State Electoral Committee 1965–84.

In 1984, the Labor member for Lakemba, Vince Durick, retired and Davoren was selected as his replacement. He won the seat easily, but was only narrowly successful in 1988. Davoren retired in 1995, the seat going to Tony Stewart.

Davoren died on 21 September 2010 at the age of 82.

References

 

1928 births
2010 deaths
Members of the New South Wales Legislative Assembly
Australian Labor Party members of the Parliament of New South Wales